Imperial Drag is the self-titled debut studio album by American rock band Imperial Drag, released on May 7, 1996, by Work.

The album was supported with a single and music video for the song, “Boy or a Girl” (which reached No. 30 on the Billboard Modern Rock Charts and No. 54 on the UK Singles Chart), alongside a promotional single for the song, “Spyder”.

Imperial Drag was the only studio album released by the group. A collection of demos (titled Demos) would be released in 2005 through the (now defunct) Weedshare music distribution service.

Track listing

CD: OK 67378
All songs written by Eric Dover and Roger Joseph Manning, Jr.
"Zodiac Sign" – 3:29
"Boy or a Girl" – 4:05
"Crosseyed" – 3:43
"The Man in the Moon" – 4:22
""Breakfast" by Tiger (Kiss It All Goodbye)" – 4:22
"Playboy After Dark" – 3:09
"Illuminate" – 4:52
"Spyder" – 4:50
"Overnight Sensation" – 4:40
"The Salvation Army Band" – 3:58
"Dandelion" – 2:50
"Stare into the Sun" – 5:16
"Scaredy Cats and Egomaniacs" – 4:57
"Down with the Man" (uncredited bonus track) – 2:52

Japanese CD: SRCS 8050
"Zodiac Sign" – 3:29
"Boy Or A Girl" – 4:05
"Crosseyed" – 3:43
"The Man In The Moon" – 4:22
""Breakfast" by Tiger (Kiss It All Goodbye)" – 4:22
"Playboy After Dark" – 3:09
"Illuminate" – 4:52
"Spyder" – 4:50
"Overnight Sensation" – 4:40
"The Salvation Army Band" – 3:58
"Dandelion" – 2:50
"Stare Into The Sun" – 5:16
"Scaredy Cats And Egomaniacs" – 4:57
"Hey Honey Please" (bonus track) – 5:51
"Down With The Man" (bonus track) – 2:52

Personnel

Musicians
Eric Skodis - drums, vocals
Joseph Karnes - bass guitar, vocals
Roger Joseph Manning, Jr. - keyboards, vocals
Eric Dover - lead vocals, guitar

Additional musicians
Mark Pfaff - harmonica on "Stare into the Sun"
Phill Cassens - Vibraslap solo on "Spyder"

Samples
 Dialogue from The Prisoner television series episode "Dance of the Dead" (4)

Production
All songs arranged by Imperial Drag and Brad Jones
Produced by Brad Jones and Roger Joseph Manning, Jr.
Recorded by Brad Jones at House of Blues Studio, Encino, CA. Assisted by Howard Willing
Mixed by Brad Jones and Roger Joseph Manning, Jr. at Ocean Way Studios, Hollywood, CA. Assisted by Richard Huredia
Mastered by Eddy Schreyer at Future Disc

Credits
Art Direction - Stephen Walker
Photography - Beth Herzhaft

References

External links

1996 debut albums
Albums produced by Brad Jones (musician)
Imperial Drag albums
Power pop albums by American artists